Kim Jun (? - 1268) also known as Kim In-kun was the ninth military leader who ruled during the late period of the Goryeo military regime.

Biography

His father was Kim Yun-Seong, a slave who betrayed his master, Choe Chung-Heon and fight with Manjeok. Kim Jun had a brother, Kim Seung-Jun but later, he was renamed Kim Chung. He was good at riding and archery. In 1258, Choe Ui was overthrown and killed by Kim Jun and Yu Gyeong (1211–1289). Kim Jun became the new military ruler and shortly after that, Goryeo concluded a war with Mongols. 

However, Kim Jun's power was much weaker than those of his predecessors, because his regime was sustained by a small number of sympathizers who coincide with the coup d'état. Kim Jun continued to insist on the war with Mongols and in this context, he began to give power to his relatives in order to strengthen his power, led to corruption and resulted in violent clashes with a few supporters of the regime. Im Yeon, who was an adopted child of Kim Jun, had a problem with Kim Chung and his wealth. 

The new king, Wonjong of Goryeo was an opponent of Kim Jun and scholars who had insisted on peace with Mongolia gained power. In 1268, Im Yeon assassinated Kim Jun and became the new military leader.
In 1268, however, Kim Jun was annihilated by the Sambyeolcho under the order of Im Yeon. The next year, Im Yeon's attempt to replace King Wonjong was reversed by the crown prince with the help from the Mongol force.

Family
Father: Kim Yun-Seong (김윤성) 
Brother: Kim Seung-jun (김승준), later changed into Kim Chung (김충, d. 1268).
Wives and their issue(s):
Lady An Sim (안심, 安心) 
1st son: Kim Dae-jae (김대재, 金大材; d. 1268)
2nd son: Kim Yong-jae (김용재, 金用材; 1228–1268); later changed into Kim Ju (김주, 金主).
3rd son: Kim Seok-jae (김석재, 金碩材; d. 1262)
Unnamed woman
Son: Kim Ae (김애, 金皚; d. 1268)
Son: Kim Gi (김기, 金棋; d. 1268)
Son: Kim Jeong (김정, 金靖; d. 1268)
Adopted son: Im Yeon (임연, 1220–1270)

In popular culture
 Portrayed by Kim Joo-hyuk in the 2012 MBC TV series God of War.

References

External links
 

13th-century Korean people
1268 deaths
Year of birth unknown
Regents of Korea
Korean murder victims
Leaders who took power by coup
Leaders ousted by a coup
Goryeo Buddhists